The Type 60 122mm towed gun is the Soviet D-74 122mm gun produced by the Chinese under licence. Developed in the late 1950s, it provided direct fire and indirect fire for the People's Liberation Army (PLA). It remains in service with reserve units in gun battalions attached to motorized infantry and armoured divisions. It is in active service with the Sri Lankan Army, introduced in the early 1990s to replace the Ordnance QF 25 pounder field gun. It has seen action in the Sri Lankan civil war.

Wars
 Sino-Vietnamese War
 Vietnam War
 Cambodian Civil War
 Cambodian–Vietnamese War
 Sino-Soviet border conflict
 Indo-Pakistani War of 1965
 Six-Day War
 Sino-Indian War
 Yom Kippur War
 Sri Lankan civil war

Users
 
  – in reserve
 
 
 
 : 200 serving in army

Former users
 Liberation Tigers of Tamil Eelam: 2

References

External links
 Type 60 122mm towed gun
 Type 60 122mm gun

122 mm artillery
Artillery of the People's Republic of China
China–Soviet Union relations
Field artillery of the Cold War
Field artillery